This is a list of video games for the original PlayStation video game console that have sold or shipped at least one million copies. The best-selling game on the PlayStation is Gran Turismo. A sim racing game developed by Polyphony Digital, Gran Turismo was originally released in Japan on December 23, 1997, and went on to sell 10.85million units worldwide. The second-best-selling game on the console is Final Fantasy VII (1997), which sold over 10million units. The top five is rounded out by Gran Turismo 2 (1999) selling 9.37million units, Final Fantasy VIII (1999) with 8.6million units sold, and Tekken 3 (1998) with 8.3million units sold.

There are a total of 117 PlayStation games on this list which are confirmed to have sold or shipped at least one million units. Of these, 41 were published in one or more regions by Sony Computer Entertainment. Other publishers with multiple million-selling games include Electronic Arts with thirteen games, Namco with eleven games, Capcom with nine games, and Eidos Interactive with seven games. The developers with the most million-selling games include Namco with eleven games, Square with ten games, and Capcom, Konami, and Sony Computer Entertainment, with six games each in the list of 113. The most popular franchises on PlayStation include Final Fantasy ( combined units), Tomb Raider (25.9million combined units), Crash Bandicoot (25.53million combined units), Gran Turismo (20.22million combined units), and Tekken ( combined units). The oldest game on this list is Ridge Racer, first released on the platform on December 3, 1994, while the most recent is Dancing Stage Party Edition, released November 15, 2002, when the PlayStation 2 had been out for more than two years.

As of March 2007, a total of 962million copies of PlayStation software had been shipped worldwide.

List

Notes

References

 
PlayStation
Best-selling PlayStation video games